Pantler was a court office in Lithuania, Poland, Ukraine and Russia, responsible for serving the royal table, then an honorary court title and a district office.

Stolnik in Crown of Poland 
In the Crown of Poland under the first Piast dukes and kings, this was a court office. 

From the 14th century, it was an honorary court title in the Kingdom of Poland, since the 16th century.
 Grand Pantler of the Crown
 Pantler of the Crown
 Court Pantler of the Crown

According to the 1768 district office hierarchy, the Pantler's position in the Crown of Poland was superior to that of Deputy cup-bearer and inferior to that of district judge.

Stalininkas in Lithuania 
In Lithuania, the pantler's position emerged in the late 15th century, comparatively later than Maršalka, Treasurer, and Cup-bearer, with the first Grand Pantler of Lithuania, being known from 1475. Initially, the pantler's took care of the Grand Duke's food warehouses, distribution of food, his manor's parks, gardens, ponds, and villages assigned to the estates. However, in the late 16th century, the position becoming purely ceremonial and the individual was charged with serving the Grand Duke at the table only during feasts. It was the sons of Lithuanian nobility that began their service in the ruler's court who were assigned the role of the pantler. Between the 16th and 18th centuries, the pantlers came from various families such as Alšėniškiai, Kęsgaila, Hlebavičiai, Chodkevičiai, Radvila, Sapiega and others. Stanisław August Poniatowski was the Pantler of Lithuania from 1755 to 1764, while the last one from 1764 to 1795 was Józef Klemens Czartoryski.

There were two types of pantlers in Lithuania:

 Grand Pantler of Lithuania
 Pantler of Lithuania

According to the 1768 district office hierarchy of the Grand Duchy of Lithuania, the Pantler was superior to podstoli and inferior to wojski.

Stolnik in Russia

Stolniks were known as palace servants of the Russian rulers since the 13th century. In the 16th and 17th centuries they were young nobles who brought dishes to the tsar's table, looked after his bedroom, and accompanied him in travels. The highest category comprised the room or closer stolniks. 

Stolniks could simultaneously serve in the foreign office or in the army. They were ranked fifth in the hierarchy of Russian bureaucracy, after boyars, okolnichys, duma nobles, and duma dyaks.

Stolniks were also attached to episcopal administrations as were other similar offices also found in the grand princely or tsarist administration. For example, stolniks are found in documents from the archiepiscopal records in Veliky Novgorod.

See also
Offices in the Polish–Lithuanian Commonwealth.
Stavilac

References

Court titles
Polish titles
Lithuanian titles
Russian nobility
Court titles in the Middle Ages
Food services occupations
Ceremonial occupations
Slavic titles